A Wheel Within A Wheel is the fourth full-length Album by Southeast Engine. After catching attention from The Wrens guitarist Charles Bissell, the band signed to Misra Records on his recommendation.

Track listing
 "Taking the Fall" – 4:00
 "Ostrich" – 3:13
 "We Have You Surrounded" – 2:08
 "Quit While You're Ahead" – 3:21
 "Pursuit of Happiness – Part 1" – 2:27
 "Pursuit of Happiness – Part 2" – 2:06
 "Psychoanalysis" – 3:20
 "Reinventing Light" – 2:27
 "State of Oblivion" – 3:57
 "Oh God, Let Me Back In" – 5:07
 "Ezekiel Saw the Wheel" – 2:09
 "Fortune Teller" – 4:19
 "Let It Be So" – 3:28

All songs written and performed by Southeast Engine.

Personnel

Adam Remnant: vocals, guitar, piano, organ
Adam Torres: guitar, harmony vocals
Josh Antonuccio:  guitars, production
Matthew Box: bass, harmony vocals
Michael Lachman: piano, Wurlitzer, organ
Leo DeLuca: drums, percussion

Southeast Engine albums
2007 albums